Adam-12 is an American television police procedural crime drama television series created by Robert A. Cinader and Jack Webb. The series follows Los Angeles Police Department (LAPD) officers Pete Malloy and Jim Reed as they patrol the streets of Los Angeles in their police cruiser, designated "1-Adam-12". Like Webb's other series, Dragnet and Emergency!, Adam-12 was produced in cooperation with the real department it was based on (in this case the LAPD). Adam-12 aimed to be realistic in its depiction of police, and helped to introduce police procedures and jargon to the general public in the United States.

The series stars Martin Milner and Kent McCord, with several recurring co-stars, the most frequent being William Boyett and Gary Crosby. The show ran from September 21, 1968 to May 20, 1975 over seven seasons.

Premise
Set in the Los Angeles Police Department's Rampart Division, Adam-12 follows veteran Police Officer II Pete Malloy, Badge 744 (Martin Milner) and Police Officer I Jim Reed, Badge 2430 (Kent McCord). Malloy and Reed reported to shift supervisor Sergeant I William "Mac" MacDonald (William Boyett). Several of their fellow officers were recurring characters; the most frequent were Officer Ed Wells (Gary Crosby), Officer Jerry Woods (Fred Stromsoe), Detective Sergeant Jerry Miller (Jack Hogan), Officer Brinkman (Claude Johnson), and Motor Officer Gus Grant (William Elliott). Shaaron Claridge, an actual LAPD dispatcher, voiced one of two police dispatchers in the show.

At the start of the series, Malloy, seeking to retire after the death of his former partner three weeks prior, is assigned to field train Reed, an inexperienced rookie, as his partner. After Reed disobeys Malloy but safely arrests a group of armed suspects during a high-risk shooting call, Malloy decides to remain on the force to guide Reed during his nine-month probationary period. The first and second seasons are not in chronological order, with Reed's stated time in the LAPD varying in each episode. Starting with the third season, the series was chronologically organized and Reed completed his probationary period, becoming a certified police officer; Reed and Malloy remained partners. In later seasons, Malloy and Reed began patrolling other divisions and working in different assignments, occasionally explained as them filling in for other officers or being part of police programs. In the show's final season, Malloy fills in for Mac as the Watch Commander from time to time, while Reed finds himself partnered with other probationary officers, mirroring Malloy's original role as his field training officer. In the series’ final episode, Reed receives the Medal of Valor for saving Malloy’s life.

The personal lives of Malloy and Reed came up on occasion and were often tied in to their duties, though they rarely extended past conversations in the cruiser or at the station. Malloy is a bachelor who has at least five girlfriends over the course of the series, the last being Judy (Aneta Corsaut), while Reed is married to a woman named Jean (played by several actresses, including Mikki Jamison and Kristin Nelson); in the second season, they have a son, Jimmy.

Vehicles 
The police cars used in the series were central to the show; Webb "wanted the vehicle itself to be considered a character". As patrol officers, Malloy and Reed spent much of their time in their cruiser, and their time driving on patrol or responding to a call was central to most episodes. Most officers in the series drove recent-model sedans, while Sergeant MacDonald always used a station wagon version of Adam-12's vehicle.

In the pilot episode, Adam-12 used a 1967 Plymouth Belvedere; for the rest of the first season, a 1968 Plymouth Belvedere was used instead, later updated to a 1969 Plymouth Belvedere for the second and third seasons. In the fourth season, Adam-12 used a 1971 Plymouth Satellite. Starting with the fifth season, and for the rest of the series, Adam-12 used a 1972 AMC Matador.

Title 
"1-Adam-12" is an LAPD callsign that is a combination of three elements: the unit's patrol division, the type of patrol unit, and the daily assigned reporting district.

The "1" means the patrol car operates in Division 1 (Central Division), serving Downtown Los Angeles. The LAPD assigns two-officer patrol units the letter "A"; in the LAPD phonetic alphabet, the letter "A" is spoken as "Adam". The "12" comes from the daily assigned reporting district, or beat.  Adam-12's shop number from the first season to the third season was "80817", but all cars from the fourth season onwards used a more accurate shop number ending in "012" (the Satellite used "83012", the Matador used "85012").

Though the "1-Adam-12" radio callsign identified it as a Central Division unit, the show is set in the Rampart Division, which uses "2" as its prefix number. Additionally, there was never a standard patrol unit with the callsign of "1-Adam-12", as all LAPD reporting districts are odd-numbered.

Production 
Universal Studios co-produced the show with Mark VII Limited. The series' first episode, "Log 1: The Impossible Mission", was filmed in September 1967, a year before the pilot was picked up.

The production of Adam-12 involved showing all aspects of correct police procedures. The show centered around police cruisers, as "Webb wanted the vehicle itself to be considered a character", and helped reinforce "the sound of radio as an anti-crime technology." The police vehicles used in the production of the show were purchased from local dealerships and outfitted by the prop department to accurate LAPD cruiser specifications.

Most scenes in the older seasons were filmed at the Universal Studios Lot, mostly Courthouse Square and Colonial Street. Starting with the third and fourth seasons, the series gradually shifted to filming in actual locations in Los Angeles and the San Fernando Valley. The garage used tow trucks from the LAPD's North Hollywood Division, close to Universal Studios.

The police station used in the series was the Rampart Police Station, located at 2710 West Temple Street. The station was built in 1966, two years before the series began, and could thus be considered "state of the art" for most of the series' run. Rampart Police Station was closed in 2008, and Rampart Division moved to the newer and larger Rampart Community Police Station. The old station was renovated to serve as the headquarters for the LAPD Metropolitan Division, the specialized division that operates the department's SWAT, K-9, and Mounted platoons. The renovated building, now known as the LAPD Metropolitan Division Facility, opened in 2016.

The driving scenes were filmed on public streets using a dedicated camera platform mounted to the hood of the cruiser, which was towed by a station wagon. The platform held three cameras: the center camera would film both Milner and McCord in one shot, while the left and right cameras would film Milner and McCord, respectively, on a cross-angle. All three cameras were remote-controlled and would roll simultaneously. For the pilot, Webb did not like the reflections of the sky on the windshield (which made Milner and McCord difficult to see), so the windshield of the vehicle was removed; however, this made the actors' hair blow and caused issues with the audio recording equipment. The prop department's solution was to reinstall the windshield and build an overhead shield that extended over the hood and windshield of the car to block the reflections. Sides were added to create a large "black box" over the front of the car with both ends "open", which allowed for more controlled filming circumstances. During filming, the script supervisor would lie on the floor in the back of the car to read script dialogue for the voices coming from the police radio, which Milner and McCord would respond to. The director and the sound man would ride in the back of the station wagon towing the police car.

In 1974, during the production of the seventh season, Martin Milner signed to play Karl Robinson on the short-lived series The Swiss Family Robinson. Several options were tested over the course of this season which would allow the series to continue should a proposed eighth season (1975–1976) move forward. Jo Ann Pflug, Mark Harmon, and Michael Warren were all tested in police officer roles, in episodes where McCord served as their training officer or partner. Another idea proposed that the series be continued with Officer Ed Wells (Gary Crosby) replacing Malloy, who would be written off with a promotion to Sergeant at another division. However, the birth of Kent McCord's son three days before the seventh season's finale aired took McCord off the show as well, forcing the series to end with the seventh season.

Reception and cultural impact
The police vehicles were central characters in that "mobile patrol units [became] associated with the black and white units made famous in such television shows as Adam-12. It was one of the shows that portrayed "the professionalism of the officers and police departments". Ronald Wayne Rodman pointed out that the theme of Adam-12 referred to a "military style topic while portraying a sense of contemporary action". Douglas Rushkoff noted, "Adam-12 also marked [the] last gasp of the righteous style of cop TV." Their set was not a squad room or an office, but the actors "watched the changes in American culture through the windshield of their squad car".

In 2003, the Los Angeles Police Department activated an actual 1-Adam-12 unit, in service with Central Division. The unit was not a standard patrol unit and was only assigned to officers who demonstrated "outstanding duty performance". It is unknown if the unit is still active as of 2022.

References in other media 
Milner and McCord made cameo appearances as their Adam-12 characters in various episodes of the fifth season of Rowan & Martin's Laugh-In.

Nashville Beat, a 1989 made-for-television film about an LAPD detective teaming up with his former partner to stop a dangerous gang in Nashville, Tennessee, starred Milner and McCord. Though the pair being former partners in the LAPD is a nod to Adam-12, the characters have different names, and the show is not mentioned or directly referenced.

Both Milner and McCord would make two appearances in a revival of Adam-12 that ran over two seasons from 1990 to 1991. In one episode, both actors made cameo appearances as the owners of a store. In the season one episode "Crack House", Martin Milner guest-starred as Malloy, now a captain; in the following episode, "R.T.D. 211", Kent McCord guest-starred as Reed, now a lieutenant.

In 1999, Mattel produced a die-cast toy police car based on Adam-12 as part of their "Star Car" series.

In a scene from The Matrix Reloaded, "1-Adam-12" can be heard over a police radio feed.

In the 4th OVA episode (“Revenge Road”) of the anime Bubblegum Crisis (1987) the callsign of one of the A.D. Police helicopters is “Adam-12”.

Connections to other Mark VII shows 
Adam-12, Dragnet, and Emergency! take place in the same universe and depict different aspects of the public safety infrastructure of Los Angeles. There are several crossover episodes on each series with characters from other Mark VII shows.

Malloy and Reed appear in the Dragnet episode "Internal Affairs: DR-20", The D.A. episode "The People vs. Saydo" (the conclusion to a crossover that begins in "The Radical"). Sergeant MacDonald appears in the Dragnet episode "Personnel: The Shooting".

The Adam-12 episode "Lost And Found" was set at Rampart General Hospital and featured the Emergency! cast. Malloy and Reed appeared in the Emergency! pilot movie, "The Wedsworth-Townsend Act". Despite the apparent relation between these shows, in one Emergency! episode, Adam-12 is depicted as a television show that the paramedics like to watch, which contradicts the officers' appearances in their aforementioned crossovers.

Several years after Adam-12's finale, Kent McCord was signed to appear in a planned third series of Dragnet playing Sgt. Friday's partner, but the project was cancelled due to Jack Webb's sudden death in December 1982. Since none of the scripts Webb wrote for the project were ever produced or released, it is not clear if he intended McCord to play Jim Reed or a different character, though in the final episode of Adam-12, the two-part "Something Worth Dying For", Reed mentions applying to join the Detective Bureau.

Revival 

A revival of Adam-12 by The Arthur Company, titled The New Adam-12, aired in first-run syndication in tandem with The New Dragnet, another revival of a Jack Webb series. Like The New Dragnet, The New Adam-12 had entirely different characters, music, and format compared to the original series, and starred Ethan Wayne as Officer Matt Doyle and Peter Parros as Officer Gus Grant (seemingly unrelated to the Motor Officer Gus Grant seen in the original show, played by William Elliott). Martin Milner and Kent McCord also had minor cameo roles as shop owners and their respective characters from the original show. Fifty-two episodes were aired over two seasons. The first season aired from September 24, 1990 to March 18, 1991; the second season aired from March 25, 1991 to September 16, 1991.

Notable guest star actor and actress appearances
Many famous performers and some who achieved fame later appeared in various episodes of Adam-12.

Episode 2, "Log 141: The Color TV Bandit", stars Cloris Leachman and Melody Patterson.

Episode 8, "Log 72: El Presidente" guest-stars James Sikking, later of Hill Street Blues fame (Lt. Howard Hunter) and other various character roles, as an armed robber.

Episode 10, "Log 132: Producer", stars Karen Black (Easy Rider, Five Easy Pieces, Airport 1975, Dogtown) and James McEachin (DJ in Play Misty for Me). McEachin also appeared in five additional episodes, each time in a different role, as well as several episodes of Emergency! as a Sheriff's Detective.

Episode 16, "Log 62: Grand Theft Horse?", guest-stars Tim Matheson as a horse thief.

Episode 19, "Log 51: A Jumper, Code 2" stars Hal Smith of The Andy Griffith Show.

Episode 22, "Log 152: A Dead Cop Can't Help Anyone", stars Barry Williams (Greg Brady of The Brady Bunch).

Episode 25, "Log 92: Tell Him He Pushed Back a Little Too Hard" guest-stars Dick Sargent (Darrin Stephens #2 of Bewitched) and Jacqueline Scott (who played Donna Taft, the sister of Dr. Richard Kimble, in four episodes of The Fugitive).

Episode 26, "Log 22: So This Little Guy Goes into This Bar, and..." guest-stars Harry Dean Stanton as a welfare hustler.

Episode 43, "Log 24: A Rare Occasion" stars David Cassidy of The Partridge Family as a neighbor of Reed's who falls victim to a drug pusher.

Episode 53, "Loan Sharks" guest-stars Eve McVeagh, film actress of High Noon, Tight Spot, and television series The Clear Horizon and Faraway Hill.

Episode 57, "Cigarettes, Cars, and Wild, Wild Women" features Tony Dow (Wally from Leave It to Beaver) as a young United States Marine who is a victim of a car theft ring.

Episode 58, "Log 55: Missing Child" guests-stars Jodie Foster as the playmate of a missing child.

Episode 60, "Log 105, Elegy for a Pig" guest-stars Mark Goddard (Major Don West of Lost In Space) as Malloy's friend and police academy classmate, Officer Tom Porter; and shows a great deal of Malloy's backstory, as well as what happens when an LAPD officer is killed in the line of duty.

Episode 66, "Log 115: Gang War" guests-stars Trini Lopez as a local Latino priest who tries to help the officers prevent a rumble between two Latino gangs. Lopez would also appear the following year as "Steve Hernandez" in Episode 95, :"The Parole Violator".

Episode 69, "Log 66: The Vandals" guest-stars Robert I. Clarke as a father of a teenage girl.

Episode 77, "Log 88 - Reason to Run" guest-stars Randolph Mantooth as "Neil Williams"; and in an Emergency! cross-over episode as paramedic "John Gage", Episode 106, "Lost and Found" This episode also guest-starred Linda Kaye Henning of Petticoat Junction.

Episode 78, "Log 125: Safe Job" guest-stars Larry Linville (later of M*A*S*H fame as Frank Burns) as a police detective whom Malloy and Reed assist on an ongoing case.

Episode 80, "The Million Dollar Buff", guests-stars Lindsay Wagner (The Bionic Woman) as a jewelry counter attendant.

Episode 81, "The Grandmother" guest-starred Ozzie Nelson of The Adventures of Ozzie and Harriet fame. He also directed this episode.

Episode 82, "The Radical" guest-starred Robert Conrad as Paul Ryan of the DA's office. This episode was a crossover with Conrad's series, The D.A.

Episode 91, "The Pickup" guest-starred Barbara Hale of Perry Mason and Kathy Garver of Family Affair.

Episode 97, "Mary Hong Loves Tommy Chen" guest-starred Foster Brooks, Keye Luke, and Jo Ann Worley.

Episode 98, "Sub-Station" guest-starred Frank Sinatra, Jr., portraying a disturbed man who takes a stewardess hostage and demands a meeting with a Hollywood director. He would also guest-star in a later season episode as an officer in the same division.

Episode 100, "Who Won" guest-starred Dick Clark of American Bandstand and Dick Clark's New Year's Rockin' Eve fame as Benson, the drag strip owner.

Episode 103, "Dirt Duel" guest-starred Edd Byrnes of 77 Sunset Strip and Micky Dolenz of The Monkees as bikers.

Episode 104, "The Late Baby" guest-stars both Tina Sinatra and Frank Sinatra, Jr. as unrelated characters.

Episode 108, "Badge Heavy" features Jack Bailey, host of Queen for a Day and Truth or Consequences.

Episode 131, "Venice Division" guest-stars Laurette Spang of the original Battlestar Galactica (1978) as a woman who fears for her life after receiving obscene phone calls.

Episode 137, "Northwest Division" guest-stars Johnny Whitaker of Family Affair as a juvenile on a minibike. In addition, Martin Milner's real-life son Andrew played Whitaker's stunt double in the minibike chase scene.

Episode 149, "L.A. International" Season 6, Episode 23, This Episode aired 12 March 1974 with Guest star Tina Cole who played Katie from My Three Sons.

Episode 150, "Clinic on Eighteenth Street" guest-stars Sharon Gless, later of Cagney & Lacey fame and most recently co-star of Burn Notice on USA Network and Frank Sinatra Jr. in his third role on the show.

Episode 158, "X-Force" guest-stars Paul Gleason as a father of a kidnapped girl. Gleason guest-starred in other various roles throughout the series.

Episode 159, "Alcohol" guest-stars Dick Van Patten, later of Eight Is Enough fame, as a belligerent drunk who believes himself to be Albert Einstein.

Episode 164, "Victim of the Crime" features Martin Milner's real-life daughter Amy Milner as Debbie McMahon, the shopkeeper's daughter.

Episode 170, "Operation Action" features Kent McCord's real-life daughter Kristen McCord as a child named Debra, who is playing hopscotch when Reed pulls up behind Malloy's abandoned car.

Episode 171, "Gus Corbin", guest-stars Mark Harmon, the star of NCIS since 2003.

Episode 172, "Dana Hall", features Jo Ann Pflug of the movie M*A*S*H as Officer Dana Hall, a probationary police officer Acting Watch Commander Malloy teams with Reed in 1-Adam-12.

Episodes

Home media
Universal Studios released Season 1 of Adam 12 on DVD in Region 1 on August 23, 2005.

In fall 2008, Shout! Factory acquired the distribution rights through an agreement with Universal. They have subsequently released the remaining 6 seasons, with season 7 packaging titled "The Final Season".

In Region 4, Umbrella Entertainment has released the first two seasons on DVD in Australia.

Broadcast
As of January 5, 2015, episodes of Adam-12 air on Cozi TV. The series had been airing on MeTV from May 2013 until January 1, 2015, when its place in the network's weekday afternoon line up was taken by Adventures of Superman. Adam-12 previously aired on Me-TV's competitor Antenna TV until April 2013, on Retro Television Network, and on i: Independent Television before that. On January 1, 2020, the show returned to MeTV as part of their afternoon block of programming alongside Dragnet at 5/4C (Dragnet aired periodically in the AM).

Internet
Episodes from Adam-12s first four seasons are available for on-line streaming on Hulu in some regions. Amazon and Apple's iTunes Store offer Season 1 available for sale as permanent downloadable files.

Freevee has all seven seasons of Adam-12 available for streaming with commercials.

References

External links

 The Official Kent McCord Archives: Adam-12 
 
 Adam-12 at TV Guide

 
1960s American mystery television series
1970s American mystery television series
1960s American crime television series
1970s American crime television series
1960s American police procedural television series
1970s American police procedural television series
Fictional portrayals of the Los Angeles Police Department
1968 American television series debuts
1975 American television series endings
American Motors
English-language television shows
NBC original programming
Television series by Mark VII Limited
Television series by Universal Television
Television shows set in Los Angeles
Television shows filmed in Los Angeles